Bhawani Mandir (Temple of Goddess Bhawani) was a political pamphlet penned anonymously by Indian nationalist Aurobindo Ghosh in 1905. The pamphlet was created at the time of partition of Bengal and penned during Aurobindo's career in the Baroda State service. The pamphlet ostensibly called for the establishment of an order of monkhood which would build a temple the Hindu Mother Goddess Bhawani (or Shakti) who was intended to represent the nationhood of India, and dedicate themselves to service in her name. It drew inspiration from Anandamath, an 1882 novel by Bengali author Bankim Chandra Chattopadhyay set in the backdrop of the Monk's rebellion early in the history of East India Company's settlements in Bengal. However, departing from Anandamath, which only portrays the land as the holy mother, Aurobindo explicitly associated the identity of Goddess Bhawani to the concept of nation. Authors such as Jussi Hanimaki and Bernhard Blumenau argue this was intended to link the symbolism and messages of Anandamath, widely read in Bengal, to the symbolism of Maratha king Shivaji who was widely admired in Maharashtra.

References

Further reading 
 .
 .
 .

Anushilan Samiti
Sri Aurobindo
Revolutionary movement for Indian independence
1905 in India